The Fifth National Government of New Zealand was the government of New Zealand for three parliamentary terms from 19 November 2008 to 26 October 2017. John Key served as National Leader and Prime Minister until December 2016, after which Bill English assumed the premiership until the National Government's defeat following the October 2017 government-forming negotiations.

After the 2008 general election the National Party and its allies were able to form a government, taking over from Helen Clark's Fifth Labour Government. It was subsequently reformed after the 2011 general election with a reduced number of seats, and after the 2014 general election with a reduced share of the party vote but the same number of seats. The Government had confidence and supply agreements with the following parties: ACT, United Future, and the Māori Party – which gave the Government a majority on major legislation. The National Party also signed a memorandum of understanding with the Green Party after the 2008 election, but this lapsed in 2011 and was not renewed.

Significant policies

Treaty of Waitangi/Settlements 
The involvement of the National government within this particular area was seen through their approach in settlements. 
National government's involvement of Treaty affairs:

 Ngai Tuhoe deed of settlement
These involved discussion and planning of guidelines which were negotiated with two significant iwis of Taranaki. This also involved Minister for Treaty of Waitangi Negotiations Christopher Finlayson.

 Apology to affiliate Te Arawa
In relation to past Treaty breaches and the actions of the previous governments at the time of the land wars. John Key apologized for the actions and doings of the abuses to the Te Arawa iwi and hapu.

 Negotiation with Te Atiawa and Taranaki iwi

Economic
The Government was elected in the context of the late 2000s recession.
 The Fifth Labour Government's Emissions Trading Scheme was delayed and the Emissions Trading Scheme Review Committee was set up to review the New Zealand Emissions Trading Scheme in accordance with the coalition agreement with the ACT Party. In November 2009, an amended version of the New Zealand Emissions Trading Scheme was adopted.
 Personal tax cuts, reducing taxes on all income; the top personal tax rate was lowered from 39% to 38% and then 33%.
 Abolished the Loss Attributing Qualifying Company (LAQC) tax structure, which had allowed individuals (mainly property investors) to reduce their individual income tax by off setting their LAQCs losses (the Look-through company structure replaced LAQCs, but without the tax benefits).
 Increased GST from 12.5% to 15% in October 2010.
 Increased the minimum wage from $12.00 per hour to $13.00 per hour in its first term, and to $14.25 in its second term. This represents a nominal 3.1% average annual increase, significantly lower than the previous government's nominal 7.9% annual average increase.
 Suspended payments to the New Zealand Superannuation Fund.
 Introduced the nine-day working fortnight for businesses who were considering laying off staff.
 Capped the minimum employers' contributions to KiwiSaver at 2%, the amount was due to increase to 4% by 2011 and gave employees the option to contribute as little as 2% of their income to KiwiSaver where previously the smallest contribution amount was 4%. The minimum employee and minimum employer contributions were raised to 3% in April 2013.
 Introduced the "mixed ownership model" plan, in which the Government planned to reduce its share in Genesis Energy, Meridian Energy, Mighty River Power and Solid Energy from 100% to 51% and Air New Zealand from 74% to 51%, and sell off the remainder. The plans to sell down Solid Energy were later axed due to the company's poor financial position. A citizens-initiated referendum on the sell-downs returned a 67.3% vote in opposition (on a turnout of 45.1%).
 Ultra-Fast Broadband rollout of fibre to the house to 87% of households
 
 Seven Roads of National Significance
Significant investments in the rebuilding of Christchurch after the Canterbury earthquakes

Constitution
 Repealed the Electoral Finance Act 2007
 Introduced the Governor-General Act 2010, to reform the Governor-General's salary and allowances.
 A second referendum alongside the 2011 election on the voting system, and after the majority voted in the referendum to retain the existing mixed member proportional system, an independent review on the workings of the MMP system.
 A Constitutional Review (as part of confidence and supply agreement with the Māori Party) starting in 2011.

Social policy

 Extended the paid parental leave scheme by four weeks
 Introduced the Employment Relations Amendment Act 2008 (the "90-day working bill") in December 2008 which allowed employers with less than 20 staff to dismiss an employee within the first 90 days of employment for no particular reason. In 2010 the bill was extended to all employers.
 Allowed employees to cash in their fourth week of annual leave, employees can now take 3 weeks holiday and be paid for the fourth while still working. The fourth week of annual leave was introduced by the previous government.
 A lifetime limit on student loans was introduced: if a student has studied more than 7 EFTS within their lifetime the student can no longer take out any further loans. Students receiving New Zealand Superannuation Fund payments or Veterans Pension can no longer receive the Student Allowance at the same time. Students are now required to pass more than half of their studies each year to receive a Student Loan or Allowance the following year, previously this requirement only affected the Student Allowance.
 Reformed social security benefits by consolidating seven major benefits into three new ones.
In 2015, introduced a $790 million of extra spending to reduce hardship among children in New Zealand’s poorest families.
Invested in insulating New Zealand homes via the Warm Up New Zealand: Healthy Homes programme which targets low-income households.

Foreign affairs
 Allowed U.S. navy ship into New Zealand for the New Zealand Navy 75th anniversary without confirmation regarding nuclear weapons for the first time in 33 years 
 Won a seat on the UN Security Council in the 2014 election, a process that started in 2004.

Defence 

 In 2012, New Zealand and the U.S. signed the Washington Declaration, strengthening military cooperation and defence relations, for the first time in more than 30 years. 
 Removal of the position of Minister of Disarmament and Arms Control. 
 The government released a new Defence White Paper in 2016, outlining the New Zealand government's strategic defence policy objectives and how the Defence Force will be structured to meet these objectives by 2030 and beyond.

National identity
 Restored titles ('Sir' and 'Dame') in the New Zealand honours system.
 Officially ended appointments to the Privy Council of the United Kingdom, which would have meant that no new designations of "The Right Honourable" would be made, and that instead ministers will be known simply as "The Honorable". However, on 2 August 2010 it was announced by the Queen of New Zealand that those appointed to offices of Governor-General, Prime Minister, Speaker, and Chief Justice would be given the title "The Right Honourable" for life, "to preserve an important mark of distinction for the holders of the nation's highest public offices". Prime Minister John Key said "he appreciated the title" and also stated "Her Majesty believes it is appropriate also to acknowledge the service of the Governor-General, the Queen's representative in New Zealand, the Speaker, the highest officer in the House of Representatives, and the Chief Justice, the head of the judicial branch of government".
Two referendums on flag change; one to determine a possible alternative, the other to decide whether to change or not.

Education
 Introduction of National Standards for primary and intermediate school children.
 Planned to change teacher to student ratios in the 2012 Budget, but withdrew two weeks later due to miscalculations regarding the effect of changes on intermediate schools and public opposition.
 Removal of all student allowances for postgraduate study at University.
 Rejected a bill for state-funded breakfast and lunch to be provided to students at all low-decile schools.
Invested $359 million to strengthen leadership and quality teaching across schools. This investment created new principal and teacher roles.
In 2016 invested $883 million in a building program to deliver various building projects including 480 new classrooms and nine new schools. This includes $168 million for the Christchurch schools rebuild programme.

Local government
In 2009 and 2010, the Government merged four city councils, three district councils and the Auckland Regional Council into one unitary "Super City". The Government's action differed from the recommendations of the Royal Commission on Auckland Governance.
In March 2010, the Government removed the Environment Canterbury's Councillors and replaced them with appointed commissioners. The elections in 2010 of Environment Canterbury councillors which were pending in 2013 were postponed to ensure a Water Management Plan for Canterbury would be created.

Health
 Increased amounts of elective surgery
Provided free GP visits and free prescriptions for children aged under 13 from July 2015.
Provided funding for the rheumatic fever prevention programme
Rebuilt Christchurch Hospital and Burwood Hospitals

History

2008 election
The 2008 general election saw the Fifth National Government elected to power with 44.93 per cent of the popular vote, ending nine years of Labour government. National formed a minority government with confidence-and-supply support from the ACT, United Future and Māori parties. The Governor-General swore Key in as New Zealand's 38th Prime Minister on 19 November 2008.

2011 election
The 2011 general election saw the Fifth National Government continue with confidence-and-supply from the ACT, United Future and Maori parties. National increased its share of the party vote to 47.3 percent, but gained only one additional seat to 59 due to a reduced wasted vote (down to 3.4 percent from 6.5 percent in 2008), largely stemming from the return of the New Zealand First party to Parliament after a one term absence. National's increased share of votes however largely came at the expense of its support parties, which saw decreases in vote share and seats. ACT only gained a third of its 2008 vote with 1.07 percent, reducing its seats from five to just one, while the defection of Hone Harawira to form the Mana Party saw the Maori Party's share of vote split, reducing the party to 1.43 percent and reducing the number of seats to three. The United Future Party saw its party vote drop by a quarter to 0.60 percent, but retained its single seat. The reformed Government and its supporters therefore held 50.41 percent of the party vote and 64 of the 121 seats in Parliament.

2014 election
The 2014 general election saw the Fifth National Government returned again, gaining a plurality with 47.0% of the party vote and 60 of the 121 seats. On election night counts the party appeared to hold the first majority since 1994 with 61 seats, but lost a list seat (for Maureen Pugh) to the Green Party on the official count (including special votes) of the party vote. National re-entered confidence and supply agreements with the centrist United Future, the classical liberal ACT Party, and the indigenous rights-based Māori Party to form a minority government.

Election results
The following table shows the total votes* for National, plus parties supporting the National-led government. For more details of election results, see the relevant election articles.

 Following the 2008, 2011 and 2014 elections, National gained support on matters of confidence and supply from ACT, the Māori Party and United Future.

Prime Minister
National Party leader John Key was Prime Minister between when the government was elected in the 2008 elections, up until his resignation on 12 December 2016.

The National Party held a leadership election to determine Key's successor as National Party leader and Prime Minister. Deputy Prime Minister Bill English announced that he would be standing for the leadership on 6 December 2016. Health Minister Jonathan Coleman and Police and Corrections Minister Judith Collins also announced their intention to seek the leadership, but dropped out due to low support from National Party colleagues. After Coleman and Collins' withdrawal, English was sworn in as the 39th Prime Minister on 12 December 2016. State Services Minister Paula Bennett and Transport Minister Simon Bridges announced they would contest the consequential vacancy for Deputy Leader; Bridges dropped out of the race after it was clear Bennett had greater support.

Cabinet Ministers

References

Further reading

External links
 National's Ministry focused on growth, prosperity Beehive Press Release, 19 November 2009.
 National-ACT agreement announced  Beehive Press Release, 19 November 2009.
 National-United Future agreement announced  Beehive Press Release, 19 November 2009.
 National-Maori Party agreement announced  Beehive Press Release, 19 November 2009.
 Memorandum of Understanding between the New Zealand National Party and the Green Party of Aotearoa 8 April 2009.

Ministries of Elizabeth II
National 5
New Zealand National Party
2000s in New Zealand
2008 establishments in New Zealand
2017 disestablishments in New Zealand
Cabinets established in 2008
Cabinets disestablished in 2017
2010s in New Zealand